Elections to Rossendale Borough Council were held on 5 May 2022, as part of the wider 2022 UK local elections.

Results summary

Ward results

Eden

Goodshaw

Greenfield

Greensclough

Hareholme

Healey & Whitworth

Helmshore

Irwell

Longholme

Stacksteads

Whitewell

Worsley

References

2022
Rossendale
2020s in Lancashire